Saint Eigion was a Welsh saint. He is the brother of Saint Cynidr. The church at Llanigon was probably originally dedicated to him.

6th-century Christian saints
Medieval Welsh saints